Eugenio de Liguoro (March 15, 1899 – June 30, 1952) was an Italian actor and film director. He was the son of Giuseppe de Liguoro, and acted in several of his films during the 1910s as well as some in the United States. He increasingly moved behind the camera, and directed the 1933 Italian comedy Country Air. His career later took him to India and Chile. His final film was the American Stop That Cab, made for Lippert Pictures. He died suddenly in Los Angeles after making the film.

The director Wladimiro De Liguoro was his brother.

Selected filmography

Actor
 Nala Damayanti (1921)
 The Fast Set (1924)
 Lost: A Wife (1925)

Director
 Country Air (1933)
 My Little One (1933)
 Stop That Cab (1951)

References

Bibliography 
 Moliterno, Gino. The A to Z of Italian Cinema. Scarecrow Press, 2009.

External links 
 

1899 births
1952 deaths
Italian male film actors
Italian film directors
19th-century Neapolitan people
20th-century Italian male actors